Kimberly Lynn Stolz (born June 8, 1983) is an American fashion model, television personality, author, and financial executive. Stolz was a correspondent for MTV News, and served as video jockey and host for The Freshmen, an emerging artist show on mtvU. Stolz first came to fame as a contestant on Cycle 5 of America's Next Top Model, where she finished fifth place. , she is an executive with BofA Securities.

On June 24, 2014, Stolz published her first book, Unfriending My Ex: And Other Things I'll Never Do.

Early life and America's Next Top Model appearance
Stolz grew up on the Upper East Side of New York City and attended The Brearley School in Manhattan. Her father worked as a stockbroker at Goldman Sachs and her mother was a former supermodel who modeled for Givenchy and Ralph Lauren. In 2005, she earned a bachelor's degree in government and intergovernmental politics from Wesleyan University; she wrote her undergraduate thesis about U.S. foreign policy. After graduating from Wesleyan, Stolz briefly worked in a law firm.

In fall 2005, Stolz was the sixth girl (after Cassandra Jean, Nik Pace, Kyle Kavanagh, Ashley Black and Bre Scullark) to be selected to participate on the fifth cycle of the UPN reality television show America's Next Top Model.  She is an out lesbian, most notably kissing Sarah Rhoades whom Stolz survived her first ever bottom two appearance over.  Later throughout her stay, Stolz received two first call-outs. The judges eliminated Stolz eighth (finishing fifth in overall rank since fellow contestant Cassandra Jean quit the competition in episode four) in London during her second collective bottom two appearance.

Career
Stolz was a video jockey for The Freshman on mtvU and was also an MTV News correspondent. In 2008, she reported extensively on the 2008 Iowa Caucus and interviewed presidential candidates John Edwards and Mike Huckabee. Stolz also pursued a career in fashion modeling; soon after she appeared on America's Next Top Model, Stolz was signed with Elite Model Management in New York City and was later signed to Ford Models in New York. Stolz also had a small role on an episode of the UPN series, Veronica Mars, as part of a challenge win for America's Next Top Model. She has also been featured as one of CoverGirl's Top Models in Action.

Stolz is signed to Ford Models. She has written articles for The Huffington Post.

In 2008, Stolz was listed as one of the most memorable contestants from America's Top Model by AOL Entertainment Canada.

In 2012, Stolz and her friend Amanda Leigh Dunn, who appeared in the reality TV show The Real L Word, opened "The Dalloway", a two-level restaurant and cocktail lounge in SoHo, New York City. It closed in 2013.

In 2014, Stolz published the book Unfriending My Ex, addressing how social media has shaped her generation.

Stolz was appointed managing director at Bank of America Merrill Lynch, Head of Americas Prime Brokerage Sales, in 2018.

Modeled for
RUEHL No.925 (Abercrombie & Fitch sister brand)
GO magazine
Brooklyn Industries
American Eagle Outfitters fall 2006
Women's Wear Daily
Knit.1 (multiple issues),
Cover magazine (April 2007)
Nordstrom (November 2006)
Pretties
Chris Benz Collection (fall/winter 2007)
eLuxury.com,
American Salon
Teen Vogue
Autostraddle online magazine

Television appearances
America's Next Top Model, Cycle 5 as herself/contestant
The Freshmen (MtvU) as herself
The Tyra Banks Show (2005) as herself
Veronica Mars as Stacy, a rental-car clerk for the Lariant Rental Car company, in the episode "Rat Saw God" (episode 6, season 2, 2005)
TRL as herself
E! True Hollywood Story: America's Next Top Model as herself
MTV News as herself
Mother May I (2008) as herself
Michael Jackson Memorial Service (2009) as herself
2009 Video Music Awards as herself
Sexting in America: When Privates Go Public (2010) as herself

References

External links
 
 Kim Stolz at MTV
 Kim Stolz Interview

1983 births
21st-century American businesswomen
21st-century American businesspeople
21st-century American non-fiction writers
21st-century American women writers
America's Next Top Model contestants
American female models
American financial businesspeople
American lesbian writers
American television reporters and correspondents
American women television journalists
Bank of America executives
Brearley School alumni
Businesspeople from New York City
Journalists from New York City
American LGBT broadcasters
American LGBT businesspeople
LGBT models
LGBT people from New York (state)
Living people
People from the Upper East Side
VJs (media personalities)
Wesleyan University alumni
Writers from Manhattan